Zabar may refer to:

Places
 Zabar, Hungary, a village in Hungary
 Donji Zabar, a village and a municipality in Republika Srpska, Bosnia and Herzegovina
 Fathah, an Arabic diacritic known in Urdu as "zabar"

Businesses
 Zabar's, a food emporium in Manhattan
 Zabr, a village in Iran